Mohammad Jahangir Osman is a Jatiya Party (Ershad) politician and the former Member of Parliament of Brahmanbaria-4.

Career
Osman was elected to parliament from Brahmanbaria-4 as a Jatiya Party candidate in 1988.

References

Jatiya Party politicians
2002 deaths
4th Jatiya Sangsad members